The 1973 Ipswich Borough Council election was the first election to the new Ipswich Borough Council which had been established by the Local Government Act 1972 in England and Wales. It took place as part of the 1973 United Kingdom local elections. 

There were 14 wards returning between 2 and 5 councillors each.

Wards

Bixley

Bridge

Broomhill

References

Ipswich Borough Council elections
Ipswich